George and Margaret is a 1940 British comedy film directed by George King and starring Marie Lohr, Judy Kelly and Noel Howlett. It is based on the Gerald Savory's 1937 play of the same name by Gerald Savory, which had run for over three hundred performances in the West End. The film was made at Teddington Studios by the British subsidiary of Warner Brothers. The sets were designed by the art director Norman G. Arnold. Unlike a number of the company's films from the era, which are now considered lost, this still survives.

Synopsis
The plot revolves around the sudden and unexpected visit for dinner of George and Margaret, a couple returning from British India to visit their upper-middle class friends in Hampstead. Their unanticipated arrival plunges the house into chaos, with the domineering and snobbish mother, absent-minded father, high-spirited adult children and the put-upon servants all at odds. While most of them resent having to play host to the unlikable George and Margaret in order to please their mother's vanity, the couple's arrival and the confusion it causes serve as a catalyst for the resolution of various problems in their lives. Heading for a happy ending, George and Margaret finally arrive for dinner, only for the house to be plunged into darkness due to a short circuit.

Cast
 Marie Lohr as Alice  
 Judy Kelly as Frankie  
 Noel Howlett as Malcolm 
 Oliver Wakefield as Roger  
 John Boxer as Claude  
 Ann Casson as Gladys  
 Arthur Macrae as Dudley  
 Margaret Yarde as Cook  
 Irene Handl as Beer  
 Gus McNaughton as Wolverton

References

Bibliography
 Goble, Alan. The Complete Index to Literary Sources in Film. Walter de Gruyter, 1999.

External links

1940 films
British comedy films
1940 comedy films
Films directed by George King
Films shot at Teddington Studios
Films set in London
Warner Bros. films
British black-and-white films
British films based on plays
1940s English-language films
1940s British films